USS LST-449 was a United States Navy  used in the Asiatic-Pacific Theater during World War II.

Construction
LST-449 was laid down on 10 July 1942, under Maritime Commission (MARCOM) contract, MC hull 969, by  Kaiser Shipyards, Vancouver, Washington; launched on 30 September 1942; and commissioned on 31 December 1942.

Service history
During the war, LST-449 was assigned to the Pacific Theater of Operations. She took part in the consolidation of the southern Solomons in April 1943; the occupation and defense of Cape Torokina November and December 1943; the assault and occupation of Guam  July 1944; the assault and occupation of Iwo Jima in February 1945; and the assault and occupation of Okinawa Gunto April 1945.

Post-war service
Following the war, LST-449 performed occupation duty in the Far East until early November 1945. She returned to the United States and was decommissioned on 16 March 1946, and struck from the Navy list on 28 March, that same year. On 27 January 1947, the tank landing ship was sold to a private purchaser for scrapping.

Honors and awards
LST-449 earned five battle stars for her World War II service.

Notes 

Citations

Bibliography 

Online resources

External links

 

LST-1-class tank landing ships
World War II amphibious warfare vessels of the United States
1942 ships
S3-M2-K2 ships
Ships built in Vancouver, Washington